Clarence Dickinson "Doc" Long, Jr. (December 11, 1908 – September 18, 1994) was a Democratic U.S. Congressman who represented the 2nd congressional district of Maryland from January 3, 1963, to January 3, 1985.

Long was born in South Bend, Indiana. He received his bachelor's degree from Washington and Jefferson College in 1932, and his master's degree and Ph.D. in economics from Princeton University in 1935 and 1938, respectively. His doctoral dissertation was titled "Long cycles in the building industry business, public, and residential building in United States cities, 1856-1935." He also served in the United States Navy during World War II. He was a former member of the United States Council of Economic Advisers to the President (1953–54 and 1956–57) and in the 1930s was a professor of economics at Wesleyan University and later Johns Hopkins University (1946–1963). Long voted in favor of the Civil Rights Acts of 1964 and 1968, and the Voting Rights Act of 1965.

Long became Chairman of the subcommittee on Foreign Operations of the House Appropriations Committee. In this role he supervised the foreign aid budget. Long's support for the anti-Soviet Mujahideen was recounted in the film Charlie Wilson's War, in which Long was played by Ned Beatty. Long was defeated for re-election by Republican Helen Delich Bentley in 1984.

References

External links

 Retrieved on 2008-01-24

1908 births
1994 deaths
20th-century American politicians
Economists from Maryland
Economists from Indiana
United States Navy personnel of World War II
Burials at Arlington National Cemetery
Democratic Party members of the United States House of Representatives from Maryland
Eisenhower administration personnel
Johns Hopkins University faculty
Military personnel from Maryland
Politicians from South Bend, Indiana
Princeton University alumni
Washington & Jefferson College alumni
Wesleyan University faculty
United States Council of Economic Advisers
United States Navy sailors
20th-century American economists